Dubagunta or Thurpu Dubagunta is a village panchayat located in Nellore district of Andhra Pradesh.

References

Villages in Nellore district